Nkosinathi Nhleko (born 14 September 1979 in Katlehong) is a South African football player who spent a season with Thanda Royal Zulu.

References

1979 births
Living people
People from Katlehong
South African soccer players
Thanda Royal Zulu F.C. players
Association football defenders
Sportspeople from Gauteng